The Black Fox (黑狐狸) is a 1962 Hong Kong thriller film directed by Yan Jun. The film was produced under the Shaw Brothers banner in the Mandarin language.

Cast
Li Lihua
Yan Jun
Yeung Chi Hing
Grace Ding Ning
Cheung Kwong Chiu
Hung Mei
Chan Yau San
Zhu Mu
Feng Yi
Ng Lai Ping
John Law Ma

References

External links
 IMDb entry

1962 films
1960s thriller films
1960s Mandarin-language films
Shaw Brothers Studio films
Hong Kong thriller films